"No, No, No" is a song recorded by American girl group Destiny's Child for their eponymous debut studio album (1998). It was written by Calvin Gaines, Mary Brown, Rob Fusari and Vincent Herbert, with production helmed by Fusari und Herbert. A sensual mid-tempo ballad blending contemporary R&B with "lush" 1970s soul, it was renamed "No, No, No (Part 1)" after musician Wyclef Jean was consulted to produce and appear on a remix of the song. Built around a hard-sliding bassline and sung in a staccato, rhythmic style, featuring co-production from Che Greene and Jerry Duplessis, it was titled  "No, No, No (Part 2)".

"No, No, No" was released as Destiny's Child debut single on October 27, 1997, by Columbia Records, with both versions serviced to radio stations and music video networks. In the United States, the song reached number three on the Billboard Hot 100 and was eventually certified platinum by the Recording Industry Association of America (RIAA). Elsewhere, "No, No, No" reached the top ten in the Netherlands, Norway, and the United Kingdom.

Darren Grant directed accompanying music videos for each version of "No, No, No". Part 1 features the group performing at a nightclub stage, while Part 2 begins with a choreographed dance in a large golden room. Destiny's Child performed "No, No, No" on several television shows and award show ceremonies, such as Teen Summit, The Keenen Ivory Wayans Show, and the Soul Train Lady of Soul Awards. It was performed during all of the group's concert tours, and is featured on their remix album This Is the Remix (2002), as well as their compilation albums #1's (2005) and Playlist: The Very Best of Destiny's Child (2012).

Recording and production
"No, No, No" was written by Calvin Gaines, former Abstrac member Mary Brown, Rob Fusari and Vincent Herbert. On Part 2, Barry White is also credited as songwriter due to the inclusion of a sample from "Strange Games & Things" by The Love Unlimited Orchestra. The original track was based on an idea from and produced by Fusari. Heavily influenced by R&B, he was inspired to start writing "No, No, No" on one of his synthesizers after listening to "Stroke You Up" (1994), written by singer R. Kelly for R&B duo Changing Faces. A few weeks later, Gaines, a songwriter and friend of Fusari's, brought producer and entrepreneur Herbert to Fusari's studio in his mother's basement in Livingston, New Jersey.

Upon listening to several demos, Herbert liked the track and asked for a cassette copy, taking it to Columbia A&R executive Teresa LaBarbera-Whites. The same night, Herbert called Fusari to tell him that LaBarbera-Whites wanted them to record the song with Columbia's then-new signees, Destiny's Child, after Herbert had told her that he would be giving the song to singer Brandy, one of his artists, had she not let Destiny's Child record "No, No, No" for their debut album. The next day, Fusari was called into their studio to arrange a production deal. After finishing writing the song with Gaines and Brown, Fusari and Herbert met with the group at the Chung King Studios in Manhattan, New York City to record "No, No, No".

Music videos
As with the single, two videos were made to promote both versions of the song, directed by Darren Grant and shot in November 1997.  In the video for "Part 1", the group performs a choreographed dance at a nightclub. Marques Houston, along with his Immature bandmates Romeo and LDB, make cameo appearances in the video. In the video for "Part 2", Wyclef Jean plays his guitar as Destiny's Child sings the chorus. Beyoncé stops Wyclef, saying, "That ain't right."  Wyclef says to the group, "Nah, nah, it's phat; all we need to do is drop a phat beat for the clubs. I'm tellin' you, they gon' lose their minds; I can see it right now." The group begins a choreographed dance in a large gold room. Wyclef Jean also makes an appearance in a room next to the room where the group is.

Both versions are included in the video compilation The Platinum's on the Wall. Part 2 is in the DualDisc edition of the album #1's, Part 1 as an enhanced video is in the Australian edition of The Writing's on the Wall.

Commercial performance
In the United States, "No, No, No" was a commercial success. Heavy airplay and high sales propelled the song into the top ten of the US Billboard Hot 100. Eventually, it peaked at number three on the chart, becoming their first single to do so. The single is the group's longest charting Hot 100 hit. A year following its release, the single had sold over 1,300,000 copies in the US, being the ninth best-selling single of the year, and had been certified platinum by the Recording Industry Association of America (RIAA).

"No, No, No" entered the UK Singles Chart at number five, and spent eight weeks within the top 75. In Europe, the single experienced modest success, entering the top 40 in several countries; it did, however, reach the top ten in Norway and the Netherlands.

Formats and track listings

 US CD single
 "No No No" (Part 2) (featuring Wyclef Jean) – 3:30
 "No No No" (Part 1) – 3:59
 "No No No" (Part 2 without rap) – 3:05

 US Cassette single
 "No No No" (Part 2) (featuring Wyclef Jean) – 3:27
 "No No No" (Part 1)

 US 12-inch single
A1. "No No No" (Part 2) (featuring Wyclef Jean) – 3:30
A2. "No No No" (Part 1) - 4:13 
A3. "No No No" (Part 2 without rap) - 3:08
B1. "No No No" (Part 2 a cappella) (featuring Wyclef Jean) - 3:26
B2. "No No No" (Part 2 instrumental) - 3:26
B3. "No No No" (Part 1 instrumental) - 4:14

 Europe vinyl single
A1. "No No No" (Part 2) (featuring Wyclef Jean) – 3:27
A2. "No No No" (Part 1) – 4:08
A3. "No No No" (Part 2) (no rap) – 3:05
B1. "No No No" (Funki Dred Remix) (featuring Wyclef Jean) – 3:59
B2. "No No No" (Funki Dred Remix) (featuring MCD) – 3:59
B3. "No No No" (Camdino Soul Extended Remix) – 6:31

 Europe CD single
 "No No No" (Part 2) (featuring Wyclef Jean) – 3:27
 "No No No" (Part 1) – 4:08

 UK and Europe CD maxi-single
 "No No No" (Part 2) (featuring Wyclef Jean) – 3:27
 "No No No" (Part 1) – 4:08
 "No No No" (Funki Dred Remix) (featuring Wyclef Jean) – 3:59
 "No No No" (Funki Dred Remix) (featuring MCD) – 3:59
 "No No No" (Camdino Soul Extended Remix) – 6:31

 UK CD single 
 "No No No" (Part 2) (featuring Wyclef Jean) – 3:27
 "No No No" (Part 1) – 4:08
 "No No No" (Part 2) (no rap) – 3:05
 "Second Nature" - 5:09

 UK CD Single 2
 "No No No" (Funki Dred Remix) (featuring Wyclef Jean) – 3:59
 "No No No" (Funki Dred Remix) (featuring MCD) – 3:59
 "No No No" (Camdino Soul Extended Remix) – 6:31
 "You're The Only One" - 3:23

Charts

Weekly charts

Year-end charts

Certifications

Release history

Notes

References

Further reading

 

Destiny's Child songs
Wyclef Jean songs
1997 debut singles
1997 songs
Columbia Records singles
Geffen Records singles
Hip hop soul songs
Music videos directed by Darren Grant
Song recordings produced by Wyclef Jean
Songs written by Rob Fusari
Songs written by Vincent Herbert